Erik Ringmar is a professor in the Department of Political Science and International Relations at İbn Haldun Üniversitesi, Istanbul, Turkey.

Background

Ringmar graduated with a PhD from the Department of Political Science, Yale University, in 1993. Between 1995 and 2007 he was senior lecturer in the Department of Government at the London School of Economics, United Kingdom, and between 2007 and 2013 he worked as a professor of political science in China, the last two years as Zhi Yuan Chair Professor of International Relations at Shanghai Jiaotong University, Shanghai, PRC. Between 2013 and 2019 he worked in the department of political science at Lund University, Sweden. Ringmar is a Faculty Associate of the Center for Cultural Sociology, Yale University, and a Fulbright Scholar.

Ringmar is married to Diane Pranzo and together they have four daughters. In the summer of 2008 he underwent successful cancer surgery, an experience that he chronicled online.

Research
Ringmar's writings cover international relations theory, history, and cultural and economic sociology. His first book, Identity, Interest and Action, focused on the concept of recognition and discusses the Swedish intervention in the Thirty Years' War as a matter of the creation of a Swedish identity. The Mechanics of Modernity discussed the origin of modern societies as a consequence of the interaction between institutions that allow reflection, entrepreneurship and the resolution of conflicts, and compares the development of Europe and East Asia. Surviving Capitalism, addresses the pathologies of capitalist development and the need for protection of social relationships and values. His most recent book, Liberal Barbarism, concerns European imperialism in China in the 19th century and the destruction of Yuanmingyuan, the Old Summer Palace of the Chinese emperor. In addition, Ringmar has published articles on metaphor, the problems of historiography, international law, social theory and phenomenology. His coming book, to be published by Cambridge University Press, is a phenomenological study of movement and international politics.

Ringmar's academic writings have been translated into Chinese, Korean, Slovak and German. In addition, Ringmar has published journalistic pieces in Huffington Post, Times Higher Education Supplement and Dagens Nyheter.

In the summer of 2019 he gave a TEDx talk entitled, "What Is a Non-Western IR Theory?"

Bibliography

References

Citations
Google Scholar

External links

 Erik Ringmar, Downloadable papers at Academia.edu.
 Erik Ringmar, "What Is a Non-Western IR Theory?" TEDx Talk, July 18, 2019.
 Erik Ringmar, "My cancer diary."

Academics of the London School of Economics
Yale University alumni
Swedish political scientists
1960 births
Living people
Academic staff of İbn Haldun Üniversitesi
Uppsala University alumni